Zimbabwe People's Revolutionary Army (ZIPRA) was the military wing of the Zimbabwe African People's Union (ZAPU), a Marxist–Leninist political party in Rhodesia. It participated in the Rhodesian Bush War against white minority rule of Rhodesia (modern Zimbabwe). ZIPRA was formed during the 1960s by the nationalist leader Jason Moyo, the deputy of Joshua Nkomo.

Operations

Because ZAPU's political strategy relied more heavily on negotiations than armed force, ZIPRA developed as elaborately training both regular soldiers and guerrilla fighters, although by 1979 it had an estimated 20,000 combatants, based in camps around Lusaka, Zambia and at the front. ZIPRA's crossing points into Zimbabwe were at Feira in Zambia opposite Mashonaland East and West. For example, the operational boundary was Sipolilo where ZIPRA, Zimbabwe African National Liberation Army (ZANLA) and Rhodesian Security Forces clashed. ZIPRA operated alone in Mashonaland West. There was no ZANLA combatants in that area until the later stages of the war.

Beside the overall political ideologies, the main differences between ZIPRA and ZANLA were that:
ZIPRA did not follow ZANLA's ideology (inspired by Maoism) but followed Soviet Marxist Leninist principles.
ZIPRA controlled zones from Sipolilo to Plumtree.

ZIPRA was in formal alliance with uMkhonto we Sizwe (MK), the ANC's militant wing. ZIPRA and MK mounted a celebrated, if strategically unsuccessful, raid into Rhodesia in the mid-1960s. The incursion was stopped by Rhodesian Security Forces, working in concert with the South African Police.

Downing of passenger planes

In 1978 and 1979 ZIPRA downed two civilian passenger planes of Air Rhodesia, killing a total of 107 passengers and crew. Air Rhodesia Flight 825 (named the Hunyani) was a scheduled flight from Kariba to Salisbury that was shot down on 3 September 1978 by ZIPRA guerrillas using an SA-7 surface-to-air missile (SAM). ZAPU (the political body behind ZIPRA) leader Joshua Nkomo publicly claimed responsibility for shooting down the Hunyani on BBC Television the same evening, saying the aircraft had been used for military purposes, but denied that his men had killed survivors on the ground. Eighteen of the fifty-six passengers in the Air Rhodesia plane survived the crash, with most of these having been seated in the rear. Three crash survivors who remained at the aircraft managed to avoid being killed by running away and hiding in the bush. A second plane, Air Rhodesia Flight 827 (named the Umniati), was shot down on 12 February 1979 by ZIPRA guerrillas, again using an SA-7 SAM.

ZIPRA commanders and soldiers

Dumiso Dabengwa, head of intelligence and member of the ZIPRA high command
John Dube, commander at the Wankie battle
Tshinga Dube, head of signals and member of the ZIPRA high command
Alfred Nikita Mangena, first commander of ZIPRA
Robson Manyika, member of the ZIPRA high command
Lookout Masuku, commanded ZIPRA after the death of Jason Moyo
Report Mphoko, chief of logistics and member of the ZIPRA high command
Ambrose Mutinhiri, commander at Morogoro
Ackim Ndlovu, member of the ZIPRA high command
Roy Reagen Ndlovu
Joseph Nyandoro, member of the ZIPRA high command
Philip Valerio Sibanda
Eddie Sigoge
Cephas Cele, chief of staff and training and member of the ZIPRA high command

References

Further reading
Rasmussen, R. K., & Rubert, S. C., 1990. A Historical Dictionary of Zimbabwe, Scarecrow Press, Inc., Metuchen, N.J., United States of America.
Sunday mail, Sunday, 8 October 2006, Zimbabwe's true armed struggle history must be told

History of Zimbabwe
Guerrilla organizations
Military wings of socialist parties
Rebel groups in Zimbabwe
Defunct organizations designated as terrorist in Africa
Communist terrorism
Zimbabwe African People's Union
Military units and formations established in 1964
1964 establishments in Southern Rhodesia
Military units and formations disestablished in 1980
1980 disestablishments in Zimbabwe